The 3rd CARIFTA Games was held in Kingston, Jamaica on April 13–15, 1974.

Participation (unofficial)

Detailed result lists can be found on the "World Junior Athletics History" website.  An unofficial count yields the number of about 137 athletes (116 junior (under-20) and 21 youth (under-17)) from about countries:  Bahamas (17), Barbados (24), Bermuda (30), Jamaica (27), Lesser Antilles/Antigua and Barbuda (8), Saint Vincent and the Grenadines (5), Trinidad and Tobago (23), US Virgin Islands (3).

Medal summary
Medal winners are published by category: Boys under 20 (Junior), Girls under 20 (Junior), Boys under 17 (Youth), and Girls under 17 (Youth).
Complete results can be found on the "World Junior Athletics History" website.

Boys under 20 (Junior)

Girls under 20 (Junior)

Boys under 17 (Youth)

Girls under 17 (Youth)

Medal table (unofficial)

References

External links
World Junior Athletics History

CARIFTA Games
1974 in Jamaican sport
CARIFTA
1974 in Caribbean sport
International athletics competitions hosted by Jamaica